Sakoanala is a genus of legume in the family Fabaceae.

Species
Sakoanala comprises the following species:

 Sakoanala madagascariensis R. Vig.
 Sakoanala villosa R. Vig.

References

Faboideae
Taxonomy articles created by Polbot
Fabaceae genera